William Dugger was a state senator in Arkansas. He was a Republican. He served in the Arkansas State Senate in 1871. He represented the Third District.

References

Republican Party Arkansas state senators